Lester Raymond Flatt (June 19, 1914 – May 11, 1979) was an American bluegrass guitarist and mandolinist, best known for his collaboration with banjo picker Earl Scruggs in the duo Flatt and Scruggs.

Flatt's career spanned multiple decades, breaking out as a member of Bill Monroe's band during the 1940s and including multiple solo and collaboration works exclusive of Scruggs. He first reached a mainstream audience through his performance on "The Ballad of Jed Clampett", the theme for the network television series The Beverly Hillbillies, in the early 1960s.

Biography
Flatt was born in Duncan's Chapel, Overton County, Tennessee, United States, to Nannie Mae Haney and Isaac Columbus Flatt. In 1943, he played mandolin and sang tenor in The Kentucky Pardners, the band of Bill Monroe's older brother Charlie. He first came to prominence as a member of Bill Monroe's Blue Grass Boys in 1945 and played a thumb-and-index guitar style that was in part derived from the playing of Charlie Monroe and Clyde Moody. In 1948, he started a band with fellow Monroe alumnus Earl Scruggs, and for the next 20 years, Flatt and Scruggs and the Foggy Mountain Boys were one of the most successful bands in bluegrass. When they parted ways in 1969, Flatt formed a new group, the Nashville Grass, hiring many of the Foggy Mountain Boys. He continued to record and perform with that group until his death in 1979. His role as rhythm guitarist and vocalist in each of these seminal ensembles helped define the sound of traditional bluegrass music. His solid guitar playing and rich lead voice are unmistakable in hundreds of bluegrass standards. He is also remembered for his library of compositions.

Death and legacy
Flatt died of heart failure in Nashville, Tennessee, at the age of 64.

He was posthumously inducted into the Country Music Hall of Fame in 1985 along with Scruggs. Flatt was also posthumously inducted as an inaugural member of the International Bluegrass Music Hall of Honor in 1991.

Lester's hometown of Sparta, Tennessee, held a bluegrass festival in his honor for a number of years, before being discontinued a few years prior to the death of the traditional host, resident Everette Paul England; Lester Flatt Memorial Bluegrass Day remains part of the annual Liberty Square Celebration held in Sparta.

Flatt and Scruggs were ranked No. 24 on CMT's 40 Greatest Men of Country Music in 2003.

Discography

References

External links
Lester Flatt biography

1914 births
1979 deaths
20th-century American singers
Bluegrass musicians from Tennessee
American country singer-songwriters
Country musicians from Tennessee
Grand Ole Opry members
People from Overton County, Tennessee
Singer-songwriters from Tennessee
American country guitarists
American country mandolinists
American bluegrass guitarists
American bluegrass mandolinists
Guitarists from Tennessee
20th-century American guitarists
Country Music Hall of Fame inductees
Nashville Grass members
Foggy Mountain Boys members
Flying Fish Records artists